The National Centre for Social Research is a registered charity trading as NatCen Social Research and is the largest independent social research institute in the UK. The research charity was founded in 1969 by Sir Roger Jowell and Gerald Hoinville with the aim of carrying out rigorous social policy research to improve society.

NatCen is best known for its annual British Social Attitudes Survey, founded by the organisation in 1983. The British Social Attitudes survey is Britain's longest-running annual survey of public attitudes and can be accessed for research through the UK Data Service. It uses a random probability method and face to face interviews with more than 3,000 people to ensure that it achieves a sample that is representative of Britain. NatCen's sister organisation, the Scottish Centre for Social Research (ScotCen), carries out an equivalent of the survey in Scotland, called the Scottish Social Attitudes survey.

In addition to the British Social Attitudes survey, NatCen collects a number of statistics on behalf of the UK government and government bodies. These include the Health Survey for England, the English Housing Survey, The National Diet and Nutrition Survey and the Study of Early Education and Development (SEED). In 2015 NatCen also launched a new panel survey called the NatCen Panel, which was the first panel survey in the UK to use a probability methodology.
 
The National Centre for Social Research is not just a survey organisation, however, it is also well regarded for its research using qualitative and evaluation methods. NatCen researchers authored one of the key textbooks for qualitative researchers Qualitative Research Practice published by SAGE Publishing.

References 

Demographics of the United Kingdom
Demographics organizations
Organisations based in the London Borough of Islington
Organizations established in 1969
Social sciences organizations
Opinion polling in the United Kingdom
Public opinion research companies